Broglie is a commune of the Eure département, in France

Broglie may further refer to:
 The House of Broglie, a noble French family with many notable members, including:
 Maurice-Jean de Broglie (1766–1821), French aristocrat and bishop
 Albert, 4th duc de Broglie (1821–1901), Prime Minister of France
 Louis de Broglie (1892–1987), physicist and Nobel laureate
 de Broglie wave, the wave-form manifestation of particles of matter
 Place Broglie, central town square in Strasbourg, France